The ETAP 32s is a Belgian sailboat that was designed by Mortain & Mavrikios as a cruiser and first built in 2003.

The design was named Boat of the Year in 2002 by Cruising World.

Production
The design has been built by ETAP Yachting in Belgium since 2003. It remained advertised as still in production in 2021.

Design
The ETAP 32s is a recreational keelboat, built predominantly of glassfibre, with wood trim. The construction is of a polyester glassfibre and closed-cell polyurethane foam sandwich, which provides buoyancy and makes the boat unsinkable. It has a fractional sloop rig, a raked stem, a reverse transom with steps, an internally mounted spade-type rudder controlled by a vertically-mounted tiller and a fixed wing keel or optional twin tandem keels. It displaces  and carries  of ballast.

The design has sleeping accommodation for six people, with a double "V"-berth in the bow cabin, two straight settees in the main cabin and an aft cabin with a double berth on the starboard side. The galley is located on the port side just forward of the companionway ladder. The galley is "L"-shaped and is equipped with a two-burner stove, an ice box and a double sink. A navigation station is opposite the galley, on the starboard side. The head is located aft of the navigation station on the starboard side.

Operational history
The boat was at one time supported by a class club, the ETAP Owners Association.

In a 2003 review Cruising World writer Time Murphy describes the vertical tiller system, "the unique helm, called EVS for Etap Vertical Steering, is a tiller that moves athwartships in a vertical plane. The vertical post is attached by Delrin rack-and-pinion gears to the rudderstock. If you're accustomed to steering with a conventional tiller, the motion of this one runs counter to everything you've ever learned: Push the bar left, and the boat steers left. But as each of our judges learned, any confusion ends quickly. 'I really enjoyed steering that boat," said BOTY judge Carol Hasse. "It's quite responsive, and the helm felt balanced.'"

See also
List of sailing boat types

References

External links

Video tour of an ETAP 32s

Keelboats
2000s sailboat type designs
Sailing yachts
Sailboat type designs by Mortain & Mavrikios
Sailboat types built by ETAP Yachting